Husmukh Bhikha (born 28 April 1958 in Wellington) is a male former field hockey player from New Zealand, who was a member of the national team that finished seventh at the 1984 Summer Olympics in Los Angeles, California.

References
sports-reference

External links
 

New Zealand male field hockey players
Olympic field hockey players of New Zealand
Field hockey players at the 1984 Summer Olympics
Field hockey players from Wellington City
1958 births
Living people
New Zealand sportspeople of Indian descent